The legislative district of Olongapo was the representation of the city of Olongapo in the Regular Batasang Pambansa from 1984 to 1986.

History

Prior to gaining separate representation, areas now under the jurisdiction of Olongapo were represented under the provinces of Zambales (1898–1972) and Region III (1978–1984).

By virtue of being classified as a highly urbanized city on December 7, 1983, Olongapo was granted separate representation for the first time in the Regular Batasang Pambansa, electing one representative, at large, in 1984.

Under the new Constitution which was proclaimed on February 11, 1987, the city was once again grouped with Zambales and formed part of its first congressional district. The district elected its member to the restored House of Representatives starting that same year.

At-Large (defunct)

See also
Legislative districts of Zambales

References

Olongapo City
Politics of Olongapo